The Voice is an American singing competition television series which premiered on NBC on April 26, 2011. Based on the original The Voice of Holland, the series features several stages of competition to search for new vocal talent contested by aspiring singers, age 13 or over, drawn from public auditions. The show has four coaches who choose their favourite artists during the audition rounds, and guide their selected teams through the remainder of the season. The winner is subsequently determined by television viewers; the prizes include $100,000 and a record deal with Universal Music Group. The Voice has been very successful since its premiere, drawing high ratings for the network and becoming one of the highest-rated shows in the country.

The Voice has been nominated for numerous awards, including forty Emmy Award nominations, winning six times, including three awards in the Outstanding Reality-Competition Program category and three awards for its lighting design. The Voice has additionally received nominations for six consecutive Critics' Choice Television Awards for Best Reality Series (four wins), seven People's Choice Awards (four wins), four Television Critics Association Awards and six Teen Choice Awards (three wins for the series), among other awards. The series has received nominations for its diversity, including one GLAAD Media Award, two Imagen Awards, and three NAACP Image Awards.

The behind-the-scenes personnel has been honored with multiple nominations, including ASCAP Film and Television Music Awards (six wins) for songwriting, four ADG Excellence in Production Design Awards, three Make-Up Artists & Hair Stylists Guild Awards (one win), and five Producers Guild of America Awards (four wins). The coaches of the show have won three awards out of nine nominations; Christina Aguilera has won an ALMA Award while Adam Levine and Shakira have both received a Teen Choice Award. Other coaches CeeLo Green and Blake Shelton have also received nominations. As of 2016, The Voice has won 36 awards from a total of 115 nominations.

Awards and nominations

ADG Awards 

The ADG Excellence in Production Design Award is presented annually by the American Art Directors Guild to recognize the best production design and art direction in the film and television industries. The Voice has been nominated four times.

ALMA Awards 

The American Latino Media Arts Award, or simply ALMA Award, is an accolade presented annually to honor the best American Latino contributions to music, television, and film. Aguilera has won once as a coach.

ASCAP Film and Television Music Awards 

The ASCAP Film and Television Music Award is presented by the American Society of Composers, Authors and Publishers to recognize the work of composers and songwriters in the film and television industries. The Voice has received six nominations and won every year between 2012 and 2017.

Billboard Mid-Year Music Awards 

Voted online on Billboards official website, the Billboard Mid-Year Music Award honors artists and shows for their achievements in music in the first half of the year in the United States. The Voice has won twice.

Critics' Choice Television Awards 

The Critics' Choice Television Award is an annual accolade bestowed by the American Broadcast Television Journalists Association in recognition of outstanding achievements in television, since 2011. The Voice has won four times out of six nominations, excluding two nominations nomination for Carson Daly as host.

Critics' Choice Real TV Awards
The Critics' Choice Real TV Awards are presented by the Broadcast Television Journalists Association and NPACT, which recognizes excellence in nonfiction, unscripted and reality programming across broadcast, cable and streaming platforms. The Voice has won three times out of four nominations.

Emmy Awards 

The Emmy Awards were established in 1949 in order to recognize excellence in the American television industry, and are bestowed by members of the Academy of Television Arts & Sciences. Emmy Awards are given in different ceremonies presented annually; Primetime Emmy Awards recognize outstanding work in American primetime television programming, while Creative Arts Emmy Awards are presented to honor technical and creative achievements, and include categories recognizing work of art directors, lighting and costume designers, cinematographers, casting directors, and other production-based personnel. As of 2016, The Voice has won six times out of forty-one nominations; three times in the Outstanding Reality-Competition Program category and three times for the show's lighting design.

Primetime Emmy Awards

Primetime Creative Arts Emmy Awards

GLAAD Media Awards 

The GLAAD Media Award was established in 1990 by the American Gay & Lesbian Alliance Against Defamation to "recognize and honor media for their fair, accurate and inclusive representations of the LGBT community and the issues that affect their lives." The Voice has received two nominations.

Imagen Awards 

The Imagen Award is organized by the Imagen Foundation, an American organization with a purpose to "recognize and reward positive portrayals of Latinos in all forms of media". The Voice has been nominated twice.

Make-Up Artists and Hair Stylists Guild Awards 

The American Make-Up Artists and Hair Stylists Guild presents annual awards to honor achievements of make-up artists and hair stylists in films, television shows, commercials and live theater events. The Voice has won once.

NAACP Image Awards 

The NAACP Image Award, presented annually by the American National Association for the Advancement of Colored People, was established 1967 to honor people of color for their work in film, television, music, and literature. The Voice has been nominated three times.

Nickelodeon Kids' Choice Awards 

The Nickelodeon Kids' Choice Awards, which are presented annually, were launched by Nickelodeon in 1988. The Voice has won two awards.

People's Choice Awards 

The People's Choice Awards are presented annually by Procter & Gamble and were first introduced in 1975. The awards show recognizes the work of popular culture, voted on by the general public. The Voice has won six times.

Producers Guild of America Awards 

The Producers Guild of America Award is established by the Producers Guild of America to honor the producing teams in film, television and new media. The Voice has four wins out of six nominations.

Teen Choice Awards 

The Teen Choice Awards are presented annually by the Fox Broadcasting Company. The Voice and the show's coaches have been nominated fifteen times; the reality show itself has won three times while Levine and Shakira have each won one award as coaches.

Television Critics Association Awards 

The TCA Award is an annual accolade awarded by the Television Critics Association in recognition of outstanding achievements in television. The Voice has received nominations every year between 2011 and 2014.

TV Guide Awards 

The TV Guide Awards are presented by American magazine TV Guide, with winners chosen by the readers to honor television programs and performers in American television. The Voice has won three times.

Young Hollywood Awards 

The Young Hollywood Awards are bestowed annually to honor the achievements in pop music, film and television, sports, fashion and social media. The Voice has been nominated once.

Notes

References

External links 
 
 Awards for The Voice at Internet Movie Database

The Voice (American TV series)
Voice